Bemis Hall, a Tudor Revival-style building of Colorado College, in Colorado Springs, Colorado, was built as a dormitory in 1908.  It was designed by architect Maurice B. Biscoe.  It was listed on the National Register of Historic Places in 1997.

Major donations towards funding the building were provided by General William Jackson Palmer, founder of Colorado Springs and Colorado College, and by Judson M. Bemis, a manufacturer who moved to Colorado Springs in 1881.

References

University and college buildings on the National Register of Historic Places in Colorado
Tudor Revival architecture in Colorado
School buildings completed in 1908
Buildings and structures in Colorado Springs, Colorado
Residential buildings on the National Register of Historic Places in Colorado
Colorado College
National Register of Historic Places in Colorado Springs, Colorado
1908 establishments in Colorado